Esha may refer to

Asian feminine given name
ill-esha, Canadian electronic music artist
Esha Dadawala, Indian Gujarati-language poet and journalist
 Esha Deol, Indian actress
 Esha Gupta, Indianactress and model
 Esha Kansara, Indian actress
Esha Momeni, Iranian-American scholar and women's rights activist
 Esha Oza, Emirati cricketer
 Esha Singh, Indian amateur shooter
 Esha Sethi Thirani, Indian fashion designer
Esha Yousuff, Bangladeshi film producer

Places
Esha Ness (also spelled Eshaness), a peninsula in Shetland, Scotland
Esha Ness Lighthouse